Ian Ramsay Fullerton (born 24 September 1935) is a former cricketer who played first-class cricket in South Africa from 1958 to 1965.

Fullerton made his first-class debut for Transvaal in 1958–59 as an opening or number-three batsman, and played five matches over the next three seasons with moderate success. He toured England in 1961 with the South African Fezela XI of promising young players, scoring his first century, 103, in the innings victory over Combined Services.

He opened the batting for a South African Colts XI against the touring New Zealanders in 1961–62, top-scoring with 35 in the second innings. He was Transvaal's leading scorer in the 1962–63 Currie Cup, with 502 runs at an average of 45.63. He made his highest score, 145, in the innings victory over Western Province, adding 207 for the second wicket with Peter Carlstein.

He scored 425 runs at 38.63 in the 1963–64 season, with two centuries. In 1964–65 he played in a trial match before the series against the touring English team, but made a pair. He did better a few weeks later in two matches against the tourists: 10 and 32 for a South African Colts XI and 17 and 92 for Transvaal. However, after that he played only two more first-class matches, in 1965–66.

References

External links
 

1935 births
Living people
South African cricketers
Gauteng cricketers